Golian is a village in the north Indian state of Punjab. It is located in the district Hoshiarpur.

Hoshiarpur
Villages in Hoshiarpur district